A robotics suite is a visual environment for robot control and simulation. They are typically an end-to-end platform for robotics development and include tools for visual programming and creating and debugging robot applications. Developers can often interact with robots through web-based or visual interfaces.

One objective of a robotics suite is to support a variety of different robot platforms through a common programming interface. The key point about a robotics suite is that the same code will run either with a simulated robot or the corresponding real robot without modification.

Some robotic suites are based in free software, free hardware and both free software and hardware.

Suites
 Fedora Robotics
ArtiMinds Robot Programming Suite
Brainlab Robotic Suite

See also
 AnyKode Marilou  
 ArduPilot 
 Autonomous Robot Control (ARC)
 Debian Science
 Evolution Robotics
 Lego Mindstorms
 Microsoft Robotics Studio
 Player Project (formerly the Player/Stage Project or Player/Stage/Gazebo Project)
 Robot software
 Robot Operating System
 Simbad robot simulator
 URBI
 Webots

References

Robotics suites